Thomas Emerson Headlam (25 June 1813 – 3 December 1875) was an English barrister and politician, who became judge advocate-general.

Life
He was the eldest son of John Headlam, Archdeacon of Richmond and rector of Wycliffe, Yorkshire, and his wife Maria Morley, daughter of the Rev. Thomas W. Morley of Clapham, born at Wycliffe rectory, and baptised on 25 June 1813. He was educated at Shrewsbury and Trinity College, Cambridge, where he became sixteenth wrangler and B.A. 1836, and M.A. 1839.

Headlam was called to the bar at the Inner Temple on 3 May 1839, and practised as an equity draughtsman and conveyancer, going the northern circuit and attending the North Riding sessions. After a contest he was elected a Member of Parliament in the Liberal interest for Newcastle-upon-Tyne on 30 July 1847, and sat for that town until the dissolution in 1874. During his political career he carried through the House of Commons the Trustee Act, 5 August 1850. In 1851 he was appointed a Q.C., in the same year a bencher of his inn, in 1866 reader, and in 1867 treasurer. He was a magistrate and deputy-lieutenant for the North Riding of Yorkshire and for Northumberland, and in 1854 became chancellor of the dioceses of Ripon and of Durham. He was judge advocate-general from June 1859 till July 1866, and on 18 June in the former year was gazetted a privy councillor.

After his retirement from parliamentary life, Headlam's health gradually failed, and on his way to winter in a southerly climate, he died at Calais on 3 December 1875.

Works
Headlam was the author or editor of:

 The Practice of the High Court of Chancery, by E. R. Daniell, 2nd edition with additions, 1845; 3rd edition, 1857.
 A Speech on Limited Liability in Joint-Stock Banks, 1849.
 The Trustee Act, 13 and 14 Vict. c. 60, 1850; 2nd edition, 1852; 3rd edition, 1855.
 Pleadings and Practice of the High Court of Chancery, by E. R. Daniell, 2nd edition, 1851.
 A Supplement to Daniell's Chancery Practice, 1851.
 The New Chancery Acts, 15 and 16 Vict. c. 80, 86, and 87, 1853.

Family
Headlam married at Richmond, Yorkshire, on 1 August 1854, Ellen Percival, eldest daughter of Thomas Van Straubenzee, major in the Royal Artillery.

References

Attribution

External links 
 

1813 births
1875 deaths
Alumni of Trinity College, Cambridge
Deputy Lieutenants of the North Riding of Yorkshire
Liberal Party (UK) MPs for English constituencies
Members of the Inner Temple
Members of the Privy Council of the United Kingdom
People educated at Shrewsbury School
UK MPs 1847–1852
UK MPs 1852–1857
UK MPs 1857–1859
UK MPs 1859–1865
UK MPs 1865–1868
UK MPs 1868–1874